The American Society of Anesthesiologists (ASA) is an educational, research and scientific association of physicians organized to raise the standards of the medical practice of anesthesiology and to improve patient care.

As of 2022, the organization included more than 56,000 national and international members and has more than 100 full-time employees.

History
Anesthesiology's roots date back to the mid-19th century. On March 30, 1842, Crawford Long, M.D. administered the first ether anesthetic for surgery and operated to remove a tumor from a patient's neck. After the surgery, the patient revealed that he felt nothing and was not aware the surgery was over until he awoke. This was the start of a specialty critical to modern medicine, anesthesiology.

In 1905, nine physicians (from Long Island, N.Y.) organized the first professional anesthesia society. In 1911, the Society expanded to 23 members and became the New York Society of Anesthetists. Over the next 25 years, involvement in anesthesia-related issues grew and attracted other interested physicians nationwide. In 1936, the Society changed its name to the American Society of Anesthetists. In 1945, the organization moved to become the American Society of Anesthesiologists (ASA). In 1960, the ASA established an Executive Office in Park Ridge, Illinois to meet growing membership and patient-care demands.  In 2014, the ASA opened new headquarters in Schaumburg, Illinois.

Membership
Membership is open to holders of Doctor of Medicine (M.D.) or Doctor of Osteopathic Medicine (D.O.) degrees who are licensed practitioners and have successfully completed a training program in anesthesiology approved by the Accreditation Council for Graduate Medical Education (ACGME) or American Osteopathic Association (AOA).

The ASA also maintains an active resident component, medical student component  as well as an anesthesiologist assistant component. Non-physician providers of anesthesia care (anesthesiologist assistants, nurse anesthetists, dentist, veterinarians, APRNs) can join as educational members.

Governance
ASA is governed by its House of Delegates. The House of Delegates is composed of ASA delegates and directors (designated by geographic distribution), ASA officers, all past presidents, the Editor-in-Chief of the journal, the chairs of all sections, the chair of the ASA delegation to the American Medical Association House of Delegates and each member of the Resident Component Governing Council not to exceed five members and a non-voting member of the Medical Student component. The House of Delegates meets each year during the Society's Annual Meeting.

Meetings 
Meetings are held annually and are based on scientific progress in the anesthesiology fields.|

Publications 
The Society publishes multiple academic resources within the following categories:|
 Practice Management
 Practice Parameters
 Continuing Education
 Patient Education
 Patient Safety/Risk Management and Quality Improvement
 Periodicals
 ASA Monitor (newsletter)|
 Anesthesiology (journal)
 Physician Booklets

Anesthesia subspecialties
While all anesthesiologists complete a minimum of eight years of medical training after college, some anesthesiologists have additional training (called a fellowship) in a specific area of anesthesiology. The ABA offers specific  certifications in some of these areas. Anesthesiologists are not required to subspecialize, but many do focus on one area of care to further hone their expertise. These specialty areas include, but are not limited to:
 Ambulatory Anesthesia
 Cardiac Anesthesia
 Critical Care Anesthesia
 Fundamentals of Anesthesia
 Geriatric Anesthesia
 Neuroanesthesia
 Obstetric Anesthesia
 Pain Medicine
 Pediatric Anesthesia
 Perioperative Anesthesia
 Professional Issues
 Regional and Acute Anesthesia

References

External links
 Official website

Medical associations based in the United States
Anesthesiology organizations
Medical and health organizations based in Illinois